Wihan "Rocketfoot" van der Riet (born August 29, 1989) is a South African professional Canadian football placekicker for the Edmonton Elks of the Canadian Football League (CFL).

Biography
Wihan van der Riet was born on August 29, 1989, in South Africa. In 2013, van der Riet posted a video of him making field goals which got the attention of former National Football League (NFL) player Michael Husted. Husted later invited him to a kicking camp in San Diego. While in San Diego he worked out with their football team, the Chargers. When he returned to South Africa he received workout invitations from the Green Bay Packers of the National Football League (NFL), and Chicago Eagles, Nebraska Danger, and Albany Empire of the Arena Football League (AFL). He couldn't accept the offers due to a work visa issue and then shifted to coaching rather than playing. He founded the "Rocketfoot Kicking Academy", a training establishment for youth kickers, shortly afterwards. In 2019, he worked out with the BC Lions of the Canadian Football League but did not sign. In 2020, he claimed to be able to kick field goals as long as 80 meters. In April 2021, he signed his first contract as a member of the Saskatchewan Roughriders of the Canadian Football League (CFL). He was released on June 18, 2021.

References

External links
Saskatchewan Roughriders bio

1989 births
Living people
Saskatchewan Roughriders players
Canadian football placekickers
South African players of Canadian football